Two Scottish League Cup finals were played in 1979:
1979 Scottish League Cup final (March), Rangers 2–1 Aberdeen
1979 Scottish League Cup final (December) Dundee United 3–0 Aberdeen (replay)